The 1976 Gator Bowl was a college football bowl game played between the Penn State Nittany Lions and the Notre Dame Fighting Irish on December 27, 1976. Notre Dame won the game by a score of 20–9.

References

Gator Bowl
Gator Bowl
Penn State Nittany Lions football bowl games
Notre Dame Fighting Irish football bowl games
20th century in Jacksonville, Florida
December 1976 sports events in the United States
Gator Bowl